William 'Bunner' Travers (2 December 1913 – 4 June 1998) was a  international rugby union player. He was selected for the 1938 British Lions tour to South Africa. Travers played club rugby for Newport RFC and was the son of George Travers, also a Wales international.

References

1913 births
1998 deaths
Barbarian F.C. players
British & Irish Lions rugby union players from Wales
Cardiff RFC players
Crawshays RFC players
Newport RFC players
Rugby union players from Newport, Wales
Pill Harriers RFC players
Wales international rugby union players
Welsh rugby union players
Rugby union hookers